William George Deacon (22 February 1944 – 18 June 2019) was a New Zealand rugby league footballer who represented New Zealand in the 1970 World Cup.

Early life and family
Born in Thames on 22 February 1944, Deacon was the son of George Deacon and Olive Susie Deacon (née Abbott). His uncle, Edwin Abbott, also played for the New Zealand Kiwis.

Playing career
Deacon played for the Ngaruawahia Panthers in the Waikato Rugby League competition and represented Waikato.
He was first selected for the New Zealand national rugby league team in 1965. That year he was also named the New Zealand Rugby League player of the year.

Deacon was included in the Kiwis squad for the 1970 World Cup and played his last test match for New Zealand in 1971. He finished his career having played in fourteen tests for New Zealand.

Death
Deacon died in Australia on 18 June 2019.

References

1944 births
2019 deaths
New Zealand national rugby league team players
New Zealand rugby league players
Ngaruawahia Panthers players
Rugby league locks
Rugby league players from Thames, New Zealand
Rugby league second-rows
Waikato rugby league team players